ACS Recaș was a Romanian professional football club from Recaș, Timiș County, Romania, founded in 1917 and dissolved in the summer of 2012.

History
The club was founded in 1917, but it played its entire history in the lower county leagues of Romanian football until the summer of 2009.

Until the summer of 2012 it played all of its home matches on the Atletic Stadium in Recaș.

At the end of the 2008–09 season it finished 1st in the Timiș County Championship and participated at the play-off for the promotion to the Liga III. It was drawn against Partizan Satu Mare, the champion of the Arad County Championship, whom they beat, 7–0, and promoted for the very first time in history to the Liga III.

ACS finished the first half of the championship 1st in the table, surpassing all expectations and having a great chance to promote to the Liga II. The pressure got to them and finished 3rd the 2009–10 Liga III season.

The following season they moved up one place and finished 2nd, but once again, they missed the promotion.

At the end of the 2011–12 Liga III season ACS Recaș finished 1st in the series and obtained a great performance, the promotion for the very first time in history to the Liga II, after 95 years of existence.

In the summer of 2012 the club was moved to Timișoara and renamed ACS Poli Timișoara  after the dissolution of FC Politehnica Timișoara. After this move the club will continue Poli Timișoara's history thus ending its own, after 95 years of existence and a premiere promotion to the Liga II.

Honours
Liga III:
Winners (1): 2011–12
Runners-Up (1): 2010–11

Liga IV – Timiș County
Winners (2): 1996–97, 2008–09

Liga V – Timiș County
Winners (1): 1994–95

References
ACS RECAŞ: Noua Cenuşăreasă din Banat!
ACS RECAŞ: Statistica turului de campionat
Cosmin Petruescu răspunde întrebărilor puse de cititorii Liga2.ro

Association football clubs established in 1917
Association football clubs disestablished in 2012
Defunct football clubs in Romania
Football clubs in Timiș County
Liga III clubs
1917 establishments in Austria-Hungary
2012 disestablishments in Romania